Nikolaos Kaltsas may refer to:

 Nikolaos Kaltsas (archaeologist)
 Nikos Kaltsas, footballer